The 2011 All-Africa Games football – Women's tournament was the third edition of the All-Africa games to include women's football. The football tournament was held in Maputo, Mozambique between 3 and 18 September 2011 as part of the 2011 All-Africa Games. Eight teams took part to the tournament.

The tournament was won by Cameroon, which defeated Ghana 1–0 in the gold medal game. Madeleine Ngono scored the game-winning goal in the 56th minute for Cameroon, which collected their first ever All-Africa Games gold medal.

Qualified teams

Only Ghana, Zimbabwe and South Africa had played games in qualifying. Other teams advanced by default because opponents withdraw. Two time champions Nigeria lost to Ghana in the qualifying.

Squads

Final tournament
The draw for the women’s final tournament took place in Cairo, Egypt on July 12 in CAF headquarters. The eight teams were divided into two groups of four teams. The two top teams from each group played the semifinals before the final match.

Group winners and runners-up advanced to the semifinals.

All times given as local time (UTC+2)

Group stage

Group A

 Guinea withdrew and Group A became a three-team group.

Group B

Knockout stage

Semifinals

Third-place play-off

Final

Final ranking

See also
Football at the 2011 All-Africa Games – Men's tournament

References

External links
Tournament at RSSSF.com

Tournament